Jamal Diggs (born July 10, 1970), better known by his stage name J-Diggs, also Jay Digs or J-Diggs tha Rockstar, is an American rapper from Vallejo, CA. He is best known for his affiliation with fellow Vallejo rapper Mac Dre and his label, Thizz Entertainment.

Legal issues
On September 14, 2012, J-Diggs and three other Thizz Entertainment members were arrested for assault and attempted murder in Hawaii.

On June 9, 2013, Washington County Sheriff’s Office arrested Jamal Diggs on a felony warrant out of Hawaii, and for drug and drug-related charges.

May 2020, arrested with his girlfriend in Rogers County Oklahoma with 4 pounds of cannabis and $12,000. Medical marijuana is legal in Oklahoma but not that quantity.

Controversy
In 2005, he was involved in a feud with rapper J-Kwon.

In February 2011, J-Diggs released a diss track at ex-Funk Mobb member Mac Shawn called "Rat Shawn".

References

 https://web.archive.org/web/20160820010147/http://siccness.net/wp/introducing-montana-montana-montana-925five-records

https://www.newson6.com/story/5eb48e7cd409fe76701d86cf/rogers-county-deputies-arrest-ca-rapper-find-4-pounds-of-marijuana

External links

1971 births
African-American male rappers
American chief executives
American people convicted of robbery
Living people
Musicians from Vallejo, California
Rappers from the San Francisco Bay Area
Gangsta rappers
21st-century American rappers
21st-century American male musicians
21st-century African-American musicians
20th-century African-American people